Gamboa may refer to:

People
Gamboa (name), a list of people with the surname

Places
Gamboa Airport, Castro, Chile
Gamboa, Panama, a town
Gamboa, Praia, a neighborhood in Praia, Cape Verde
Gamboa, Rio de Janeiro, a neighborhood
Gamboa (crater), a crater on Mars

See also
Ullíbarri-Gamboa, a hamlet in the Basque Country, Spain